Peter Wragg (12 January 1931 – 24 June 2004) was an English footballer who played as an inside forward.

Career
Born in Rotherham, West Riding of Yorkshire, Wragg played for Rotherham United, Sheffield United, York City and Bradford City. He scored 106 total goals in 424 career appearances. He died in Plymouth, Devon on 24 June 2004.

References

1931 births
Footballers from Rotherham
2004 deaths
English footballers
Association football inside forwards
Rotherham United F.C. players
Sheffield United F.C. players
York City F.C. players
Bradford City A.F.C. players
English Football League players